The 1947–48 IHL season was the third season of the International Hockey League, a North American minor professional league. Six teams participated in the regular season, and the Toledo Mercurys won the Turner Cup.

Regular season

Turner Cup-Playoffs

External links
 Season 1947/48 on hockeydb.com

IHL
IHL
International Hockey League (1945–2001) seasons